Opisthoxia amabilis is a moth of the family Geometridae first described by Pieter Cramer in 1777. It is found in Suriname.

References

Moths described in 1777
Ennominae
Moths of South America